Ivan Lenđer (Serbian Cyrillic: Иван Ленђер, Rusyn: Иван Лендєр) (born 29 July 1990, in Zrenjanin, SFR Yugoslavia) is an Olympic swimmer from Serbia. He swam for Serbia at the 2008 and 2012 Summer Olympics. In 2006 he was named Serbia's best young athlete. He is partially of Rusyn descent.

He has swum for Serbia at:
2006 Junior Worlds — 1st 100 fly
2007 European Juniors — 2nd 50 fly, 1st 100 fly
2008 Junior Worlds — 1st 50 fly, 1st 100 fly
2008 European Juniors — 1st 50 fly, 1st 100 fly
2008 Olympics — 40th 100 fly
2009 Mediterranean Games — 1st 100 fly
2009 World Championships — 11th 100 fly, 18th 50 fly
2009 Short Course Europeans — 3rd 100 fly
2010 European Championships — 8th 50 fly, 10th 100 fly
 2011 World Championships — 11th 50 fly, 24th 100fly
 2012 European Championships — 4th 100 fly, 7th 50 fly
 2013 Mediterranean Games — 1st 50 fly, 1st 100 fly

Olympic results

See also
 List of swimmers
 List of European Short Course Swimming Championships medalists (men)
 List of Serbian records in swimming

References

External links
 
 
 
 
 

1990 births
Living people
Sportspeople from Zrenjanin
Male butterfly swimmers
Serbian male swimmers
Swimmers at the 2008 Summer Olympics
Swimmers at the 2012 Summer Olympics
Olympic swimmers of Serbia
Mediterranean Games gold medalists for Serbia
Swimmers at the 2009 Mediterranean Games
Swimmers at the 2013 Mediterranean Games
Swimmers at the 2018 Mediterranean Games
Mediterranean Games medalists in swimming
Serbian people
Serbian people of Rusyn descent